The 2022 Sentinel Storage Alberta Scotties Tournament of Hearts, the provincial women's curling championship for Alberta, was held January 3 to 9 at the Bonnetts Energy Centre in Grande Prairie, Alberta. The winning Laura Walker team represented Alberta at the 2022 Scotties Tournament of Hearts in Thunder Bay, Ontario, and finished with a 3–5 record. The event was held in conjunction with the 2022 Boston Pizza Cup, the provincial men's curling championship.

Qualification process

Teams
The teams are listed as follows:

Round-robin standings
Final round-robin standings

Round-robin results
All draw times are listed in Mountain Time (UTC-07:00).

Draw 1
Monday, January 3, 9:00 am

Draw 2
Monday, January 3, 7:00 pm

Draw 3
Tuesday, January 4, 2:00 pm

Draw 4
Wednesday, January 5, 9:00 am

Draw 5
Wednesday, January 5, 2:00 pm

Draw 6
Thursday, January 6, 2:00 pm

Draw 7
Thursday, January 6, 7:00 pm

Draw 8
Friday, January 7, 2:00 pm

Playoffs

Semifinal
Saturday, January 8, 2:30 pm

Final
Sunday, January 9, 11:00 am

Qualification

Qualifier #1
November 25–28, Fort Saskatchewan Curling Club, Fort Saskatchewan

Qualifier #2
December 2–5, Vulcan Curling Club, Vulcan

References

External links

2022 in Alberta
Curling in Alberta
2022 Scotties Tournament of Hearts
January 2022 sports events in Canada
Sport in Grande Prairie